A tenaja or tinaja is a water basin or retention area. The term usually implies a natural or geologic cistern in rock which retains water. They are often created by erosional processes within intermittent streams.

Before European settlers came to America, tenajas were a valuable source of water for early Native Americans traveling in the desert areas of the Southwest. Today, tenajas are an integral part of sustaining life in the arid Southwest. For example, tenajas at the Santa Rosa Plateau in southern California allow western pond turtles, California newts and red-legged frogs to survive through dry summer months.

During prolonged dry spells, deep tinajas may trap desert animals who cannot climb out due to the smooth walls.

Etymology 
From the Spanish tinaja: a clay pot or earthenware jar.

List of tenajas 

 Tenaja Canyon Creek, Cleveland National Forest, California, USA
 Ernst Tinaja, Big Bend National Park, Texas, USA
 Santa Rosa Plateau Wildlife Area, Riverside County, California, USA

References

Hydrology